Rugigegat radzha is a moth in the family Cossidae. It was described by Yakovlev in 2009. It is found in southern India.

References

Zeuzerinae
Moths described in 2009